Allen Edwards (18 November 1868 – 1 January 1961) was an Australian cricketer. He played one first-class matches for South Australia in 1892/93.

See also
 List of South Australian representative cricketers

References

External links
 

1868 births
1961 deaths
Australian cricketers
South Australia cricketers
Cricketers from Adelaide